Greenvine in an unincorporated community in southwestern Washington County, Texas, United States. It is approximately five miles southwest of Burton.  In the late nineteenth century, the population peaked around 300, mostly consisting of German immigrants.

The community is served by the Burton Independent School District.

Geography

References

Greenvine, Texas, at Handbook of Texas Online

Unincorporated communities in Texas
Unincorporated communities in Washington County, Texas